The 2011 Internazionali Tennis Val Gardena Südtirol was a professional tennis tournament played in Ortisei, Italy between 7 and 13 November 2011 on carpet courts. It was the second edition of the tournament which is part of the 2011 ATP Challenger Tour.

ATP entrants

Seeds

 1 Rankings are as of October 31, 2011.

Other entrants
The following players received wildcards into the singles main draw:
  Federico Gaio
  Claudio Grassi
  Dudi Sela
  Matteo Trevisan

The following players received entry from the qualifying draw:
  Mikhail Elgin
  Mateusz Kowalczyk
  Michal Schmid
  Marcel Zimmermann

Champions

Singles

 Rajeev Ram def.  Jan Hernych, 7–5, 3–6, 7–6(8–6)

Doubles

 Dustin Brown /  Lovro Zovko def.  Philipp Petzschner /  Alexander Waske, 6–4, 7–6(7–4)

External links
Official Website
ITF Search 
ATP official site

Internazionali Tennis Val Gardena Sudtirol
Carpet court tennis tournaments
Internazionali Tennis Val Gardena Südtirol
2011 in Italian tennis